Badarpur is a village in Budaun Tehsil and Budaun district, Uttar Pradesh, India.  As per constitution of India and Panchyati Raaj Act Badarpur village is administrated by Gram panchayat. Badarpur is 7 kilometers away from Badaun City. There are 130 houses in Badarpur village.

See also
 List of villages in India
 Budaun district
 Aam Ganv

References 

Villages in Budaun district